The 1950 Giro di Lombardia, 44th edition of the race, was held on 22 October 1950.

General classification

Final general classification

References

1950
1950 in road cycling
1950 in Italian sport
1950 Challenge Desgrange-Colombo